Ropars is a Breton-language surname. Notable people with the surname include:

 - Breton traditional singer
 - Breton poet
Erwan Ropars - Piper on l'Héritage des Celtes,  of the bagad Kemper for 25 years and founder of the bagad Kerne
 - Commander of the SS France from September 1963 to July 1966
 - theorist of literature, cinema and aesthetics
Guy Ropartz - French composer
 Marcel Ropars - Penn-soner of the bagad  from 1955 to 1958
 Eugénie Ropars - Founder of the Celtic circle Poullaouen in the 1930s

References

Breton-language surnames